Maxime Crochemore (born 1947) is a French computer scientist known for his numerous contributions to algorithms on strings. He is currently a professor at King's College London.

Biography
Crochemore earned his doctorate (PhD) in 1978 and his Doctorat d'état (DSc) in 1983 from the University of Rouen. He was a professor at Paris 13 University in 1985–1989, and moved to a professorship at Paris Diderot University in 1989. In 2002–2007, Crochemore was a senior research fellow at King's College London, where he is a professor since 2007. Since 2007, he is also a professor emeritus at the University of Marne-la-Vallée.

Crochemore holds an honorary doctorate (2014) from the University of Helsinki. A festschrift in his honour was published in 2009 as a special issue of Theoretical Computer Science.

Research contributions
Crochemore published over 100 journal papers on string algorithms. He in particular introduced new algorithms for pattern matching, string indexing and text compression. His work received a significant number of academic citations.

Crochemore has co-authored three well-known scientific monographs on the design of algorithms for string processing: "Text Algorithms" (1994; jointly with Wojciech Rytter), "Jewels of Stringology" (2002, jointly with Wojciech Rytter), and "Algorithms on Strings" (2007, jointly with Christophe Hancart and Thierry Lecroq).

References

French computer scientists
French expatriates in the United Kingdom
1947 births
Living people
Theoretical computer scientists
Academics of King's College London